Filippo Antonio Revelli (1716 – 1801) was an Italian mathematician.

Life 
He was professor of geometry for 26 years at the University of Turin.

He had among his pupils Joseph-Louis Lagrange.

His son Vincenzo Antonio Revelli (1764-1835) was a philosopher and painter.

Works

References 

1716 births
1801 deaths
18th-century Italian mathematicians
Academic staff of the University of Turin